Sanjay Sharma (born 1969), also known as Juan Carlos Sánchez Pinto Clasen among other false identities, is an Indian serial killer currently serving a life sentence in Denmark for the double murder of his wife and her child in 1999, which he committed while on the run from Indian police, who were planning to charge him with the murder of his second wife in Austria two years prior.

Early life and first marriage 
Sanjay Sharma was born in 1969 in New Delhi, India, one of two boys in a family with four children. When he was five years old, his older brother, Anil, was sent to a boarding school, but despite this, Sanjay constantly looked up to his brother. When he became an adult, Anil moved to the United States, where he began a career as a businessman in New York City. Eager to join his brother, Sanjay dropped out of school and moved to the city in search of financial opportunities, first living with his brother and then with some friends. In order to earn an income, he took on jobs at an electronic store and then a grocery store, for which he was described as a hard worker by Anil. While residing in New York City, Sanjay would meet 20-year-old Ecuadorian national Cecilia Mantuano, with whom he began a romantic relationship.

In 1992, the couple were married, and a year later, Cecilia gave birth to a son, Alexander, at Queens Hospital Center. Shortly after that, however, their marriage began to be marked by frequent scandals and threats from Sharma, which resulted in Mantuano seeking a restraining order from the courts. By that time, Sharma fled back to India, without officially divorcing his wife. He decided to remain in the country and lay low for a while, and during his frequent plane trips between New Delhi and Mumbai, he would become acquainted with 23-year-old Razi Singh, a flight attendant for Jet Airways.

Second marriage and first murder 
Despite the  disapproval of her family, Singh began dating Sharma, who presented himself as an officer working in the NYPD. While he acted courteous and friendly towards the Singh family, they treated him with suspicion and forbid him marrying their daughter. Without the family's knowledge, Sharma and Razi married at a New Delhi temple on July 8, 1997. Not long after, Sharma started to act violently towards his new wife, handcuffing her to the bed, forbidding her to talk to her parents and monitoring her phone calls. On top of that, he demanded that Razi's family give him a car, a new house and a dowry worth 1,000,000 rupees, something they categorically refused to do, as they were both unable and unwilling to pay that sum. Profoundly angered by their refusal, about a month after the wedding, Sharma burned down the family's house and a neighboring restaurant, shortly after threatening his wife's father, Sanwal, with a hammer. In response, the father called the police, who promptly arrested Sharma and charged him with illegal possession of a weapon, after they found that he was also carrying a handgun.

While he was detained for a week, Razi Singh returned to her parents. One day, while looking through her husband's passport, she was mortified to learn that he was actually married to another woman back in the USA. She wrote a letter to Mantuano and to the local police, pressing for further questions about the dubious past of Sharma, unfortunately she did not receive a reply before his release on bail. He then picked up his wife and brought her to his mother's home in Rohini, where it was alleged that he began sedating her to keep her from escaping. On November 24, 1997, Sharma took out an insurance policy on his wife worth $50,000 from the United India Insurance Company, whereupon he booked two tickets bound for Austria. The couple landed in the country via the Innsbruck Airport on the evening of November 30th, from where they travelled to Absam, where Sharma's sister and brother-in-law lived. The next few days, the couple went on excursions and shopping sprees, but on December 4th, while they were alone in the house, Razi decided to take a bath at around 11 o'clock. About an hour and a half later, she was found dead in the bathtub, which suspiciously had a hair dryer submerged.

Despite the circumstances, and Sharma having a weak alibi, an Austrian coroner declared that the Razi had died from electric shock, but still considered the death worthy of further investigation. An inquiry by local authorities determined that the death was an accident, but were unable to explain how the hair dryer had found its way to the bathtub. In contrast to their Austrian counterparts, the CID which were aware of the couple's tumultuous past and started their own inquiry into the matter. While Sharma managed to cremate his wife's body in Austria, he was allowed to transport the ashes in an urn back to her home in New Delhi. He mysteriously "lost" the urn during the trip back home, claiming that the bag he had carried the urn in, had been stolen. This claim was disputed by both Singh's family members and police, who arrested him on December 20th and charged him with murder.

Escape to Denmark, and third marriage 
Sharma spent a year and a half in custody while awaiting his trial. On March 20, 1999, after a court hearing in New Delhi, he bribed two police officers to drive him to his mother's house, from where he fled New Delhi and India altogether. After his brother called police and told them Sanjay had attempted contact him, he was declared a fugitive, with his photographs plastered on newspapers and showcased on India's Most Wanted. Between March and August 1999, Sharma, using the fake names of "Alexander López" and "James Kennedy", travelled between numerous countries, including Bangladesh, Thailand, Hong Kong, Jamaica, Costa Rica, Brazil, Germany and Austria. On August 27, 1999, he landed in Greenland, where he presented himself as a Venezuelan citizen by the name of Juan Carlos Sánchez Pinto. Upon arriving at the airport, he befriended two local men who allowed him to temporarily stay at their apartment in Nuuk.

After residing with the men for a few days, Sharma would meet 23-year-old Carla Clasen, a divorcée who sold clothes in front of the Brugsen supermarket, who was living together with her 2-year-old daughter, Natuk. Not long after their meeting, Clasen fell in love with the man she knew only as Sánchez Pinto, and only fourteen days later, they were married. However, problems began to arise the day after their wedding, Sharma would frequently leave home for many hours at a time, allegedly to have sexual intercourse with two gay men in Nuuk. There were also rumors that he had dabbled into hashish smuggling, and the reason why he had married Carla was to get another surname and make her a courier. A few weeks later, Sharma travelled to Esbjerg, where he bought an apartment in Kvanglundparken. Less than two weeks later, Carla and little Natuk moved in with him, and the family remained there for some time.

Double murder and flight 
On October 9, 1999, Sharma rented the "Bacchus" holiday home in Fanø, to where he travelled together with Carla and Natuk, ostensibly to have a relaxing family vacation. However, just three days later, Sharma booked a one-way ticket to Ottawa, Canada and left without his wife or his adopted child. He never reported either of them missing, and the mysterious disappearances arose suspicion, but when queried about them, Sharma claimed that they were in Venezuela. On February 8, 2000, police were called to the cottage when a neighbor reported that he had seen a child's arm sticking out of the sand, near a slope. The authorities dug up the body, which was quickly identified as that of Natuk Clasen, while her mother's corpse was found buried in a nearby toolshed. A forensic autopsy concluded that Carla had suffered multiple injuries to the head, while Natuk, who was found with sand in her mouth, had likely been suffocated to death. Sharma, or Sánchez Pinto Clasen as he was known to Danish police, was officially charged with the murders and declared an international fugitive via Interpol.

Arrest and trial 
Initially, it was believed that Sharma might've been hiding out in Copenhagen, where he had acquaintances. In actuality, Sharma was laying low in Long Island, where he had recently applied for a taxi driver license. Unbeknownst to him, ever since his arrival from Canada, he had been monitored by the FBI, who suspected him of residing in the country illegally. On May 18, 2000, he was arrested in front of a bank in Brooklyn without incident and driven to a local police station, where he admitted that he was being sought by the Danish authorities for a double homicide, but denied being the actual culprit.

He voluntarily waived his right to a hearing and was extradited back to Denmark, where he was charged with the murders of Carla Clasen and Natuk. Approximately one month later, in June 2000, while he was still in custody, Sharma attempted to escape by setting fire to a cupboard in his cell, causing the entire prison block to be evacuated. The attempt failed, and following that incident, he was placed in maximum security detention in Horsens, as authorities feared he might take hostages or other violent actions against other inmates.

During the course of the trial, witness testimony from friends and acquaintances of both Sharma and Clasen revealed that the former had no love interest in the latter, as less than two hours after his wedding, Sharma had attempted to apply for residency and a work permit. In addition, two of Sharma's gay lovers, Torben and Jan Kvik, confirmed that on that same wedding night, they had a threesome with Sharma which was recorded on video, and that he had called his wife a "big fat cow" on several occasions. 

Despite Sanjay Sharma's claims of innocence and criticisms that the Danish police hadn't done a proper investigation, a 12-member jury panel found him guilty of both murders, and he was subsequently convicted, receiving the mandatory sentence of life imprisonment.

Imprisonment 
Shortly after his conviction, Sharma appealed his sentence to the Supreme Court, which upheld the verdict in November 2001. Since 2012, he has been eligible for parole, but has thus far not been approved for it. In 2005, Sharma's new girlfriend, Ketty Andersen, made an interview with Ekstra Bladet, during which she asserted her belief that he's a scapegoat and would fight for his release, and if that ever happened, they would marry and move to Sweden.

See also
List of serial killers by country

References 

1969 births
20th-century Indian criminals
Fugitives
Fugitives wanted by India
Fugitives wanted on murder charges
Indian murderers of children
Indian people convicted of murder
Indian people imprisoned abroad
Indian prisoners sentenced to life imprisonment
Indian prisoners and detainees
Indian serial killers
Indian LGBT people
Living people
Male criminals
Male serial killers
People convicted of murder by Denmark
People from New Delhi
Prisoners and detainees of Denmark
Prisoners sentenced to life imprisonment by Denmark
Uxoricides